aka Inferno of the Flesh is a 1968 Japanese pink film directed by Kan Mukai. It is in the part-color format which was used in pink films in the late 1960s and early 1970s before full-color was made standard with the introduction of Nikkatsu's Roman porno series.

Synopsis
One member of a secret society of female ninjas in contemporary Tokyo is kidnapped by international slave traders. The other female ninjas set about rescuing her.

Cast
 Kozue Katori as Keiko (spy)
 Mari Nagisa as Akemi (spy)
 Jōji Ōhara as Boss of female ninjas

Critical appraisal
Director Kan Mukai was known for both his sex-oriented pink films and for his adeptness with action. In their Japanese Cinema Encyclopedia: The Sex Films the Weissers write that with Modern Female Ninja: Flesh Hell Mukai combined his talents for both genres into one film. They give the film three out of four stars, characterizing it as, "Tongue-in-cheek fun, combining some surprisingly vicious S&M sequences with campy female-ninja hijinx." One of the earlier films from Mukai's independent Mukai Studios, the Weissers speculate that this film may have been an inspiration for director Masahiro Kasai's popular Female Neo Ninjas (1991).

Bibliography

English

Japanese

Notes

1968 films
Films directed by Kan Mukai
1960s Japanese-language films
Pink films
1960s Japanese films